On 15 September 2019, Solomon Islands parliament voted to change the country's diplomatic recognition from Taiwan to China; diplomatic recognition of either Taiwan or China is mutually exclusive. On 21 September 2019 Solomon Islands and the People's Republic of China issued a joint communiqué establishing relations. An exchange of ambassadors on both sides is yet to be made.

List of representatives

See also 
 List of ambassadors of Solomon Islands to Taiwan
 List of diplomatic missions in Solomon Islands
 List of diplomatic missions of Solomon Islands
 Minister of Foreign Affairs (Solomon Islands)

References 

Ambassadors of the Solomon Islands to China
Solomon Islands
China